Culex (Lophoceraomyia) quadripalpis is a species of mosquito belonging to the genus Culex. It is found in Cambodia, India, Indonesia, Malaysia, Philippines, Singapore, Sri Lanka, Thailand, and Vietnam.

References 

quadripalpis
Insects described in 1914